Piotr Kochanowski (1566–1620) was a Polish nobleman, poet and translator. He belonged to a family of writers. He was a son of Mikołaj Kochanowski and a nephew of Jan Kochanowski. He was born in 1566 in Sycyna. He is famous for his translations from Italian. He translated into Polish what were generally esteemed to be the two greatest modern epic poems: Ludovico Ariosto's Orlando furioso (Roland Enraged) and Torquato Tasso's Gerusalemme liberata (Jerusalem Delivered). His version of Tasso's poem served as the Polish national epic. Piotr Kochanowski was the second poet in Poland (after Sebastian Grabowiecki) to use ottava rima, which became very popular in Baroque Polish poetry. He died on 2 August 1620 and was buried at the Franciscan church in Cracow. He is commonly regarded as one of the most important Polish writers of the Renaissance.

Notes

External links
 Gofred albo Jeruzalem wyzwolona. Poemat bohaterski Torkwata Tasa. Przekład Piotra Kochanowskiego. Wydanie Kazimierza Józefa Turowskiego. Nakład i druk Karola Pollaka, Sanok 1856.

1566 births
1620 deaths
Renaissance writers
Polish Roman Catholics
16th-century Polish nobility
Polish poets
Polish translators
University of Königsberg alumni
University of Padua alumni
17th-century Polish nobility